
This is a list of players who graduated from the Challenge Tour in 2007. The top 20 players on the Challenge Tour's money list in 2007 earned their European Tour card for 2008.

* European Tour rookie in 2008
T = Tied 
 The player retained his European Tour card for 2009 (finished inside the top 118).
 The player did not retain his European Tour Tour card for 2009, but retained conditional status (finished between 119-151).
 The player did not retain his European Tour card for 2009 (finished outside the top 151).

The players ranked 16th through 20th were placed below the Qualifying School graduates on the exemption list, and thus could improve their status by competing in Qualifying School. François Delamontagne and Jan-Are Larsen improved their status in this way.

Winners on the European Tour in 2008

Runners-up on the European Tour in 2008

See also
2007 European Tour Qualifying School graduates

External links
Final ranking for 2007

Challenge Tour
European Tour
Challenge Tour Graduates
Challenge Tour Graduates